Rustico Roldan (October 26, 1931 – April 7, 2022), professionally known as Carlos Salazar  was a Filipino actor and a matinee idol in the 1950s. A contemporary of the likes of Delia Razon, Rosa Rosal, Jaime Dela Rosa and Nestor de Villa, Roldan took up the screen name of Carlos Salazar and began his career with LVN Pictures, and made several hit movies. After making 15 films for the said studio, Salazar made one film under Champion Pictures entitled Objective: Patayin si Magsaysay, and one film under Larry Santiago Production for Student Canteen.

His first film under Sampaguita Pictures was Madaling Araw, an Amalia Fuentes and Juancho Gutierrez movie, followed by Alaalang Banal ("Sacred Memory"), which starred Gloria Romero.

Then he made another film with Lolita Rodriguez and Luis Gonzales under the title of Talipandas ("Traitor").

Later career
Salazar remained active as a film actor up to mid-1990s.

He also produced and directed films for his brother-in-law, action star Eddie Fernandez.  Salazar's last television appearance was on Be Careful with My Heart in 2014.

Personal life
Salazar was married to model Carmen "Menchu" Fernandez until her death in 2013.  They had seven children.  He died peacefully on April 7, 2022 at home in Quezon City.

Filmography
1952 – Tia Loleng
1952 – Digmaan ng Damdamin
1953 – Philippine Navy
1953 – Ganyan Lang ang Buhay
1953 – Dalagang Nayon
1954 – Abarinding
1954 – Mabangong Kandungan
1954 – Hiram Na Kasintahan
1955 – Tagapagmana
1955 – Pasikat
1955 – Ang Ibong Adarna
1955 – Karnabal
1955 – Salamangkero
1956 – May Araw Ka Rin
1956 – Abandonado
1957 – Objective: Patayin si Magsaysay
1957 – Student Canteen
1958 – Madaling Araw
1958 – Alaalang Banal
1958 – Talipandas
1988 – Ang Anino ni Asedillo

References

External links

1931 births
2022 deaths
Filipino male film actors
Male actors from Manila